William Finlay (22 February 1840  18 June 1886) was a policeman and the first mayor of Albany in the Great Southern region of Western Australia.

Parents
Finlay's parents were William and Marjory Finlay. His father, William Finlay (5 June 1807  11 June 1890) was born in Dundee, Scotland in 1807. He served in the army and rose to the rank of sergeant.
William Jr. was born in 1840 in Ireland.

Early life
The Finlays, both parents and three children, arrived in Western Australia aboard the convict ship Scindian in 1850 and initially settled at Freshwater Bay. Another five children were born in Western Australia over the next few years.

Police
Finlay joined the police force in 1858; he served as a constable in Albany in 1864, moving to Williams in 1869, then to York in 1873 and then to Geraldton in 1874. He rose to the rank of sub-inspector in Albany in 1878.

During his time in the force he married Sarah Coppin in Busselton in 1861.

Albany
Finlay resigned from the force in 1878 and was well remembered for his charitable work, administration skills and founding a local militia. He remained in Albany working as a clerk of customs and a tide waiter and also served as a municipal councillor. He was elected as the first mayor of Albany in 1885. The other candidates in the election were John Moir and Robert Andrew Muir.
Finlay's home in Albany, known as McKenzie House or the White House, a grand federation style building overlooking Albany Port, is a still a local landmark.

See also
 List of mayors of Albany, Western Australia

References

1840 births
1885 deaths
Irish emigrants to colonial Australia
19th-century Australian politicians
Mayors of Albany, Western Australia